The Amalat is a river in Buryatia, Russia. It is the largest tributary of the Tsipa, of the Vitim basin. The villages of Baysa, Mongoy and Rossoshino are the only inhabited places close to the banks of the river. There are jade deposits in the Amalat river basin, including the valuable white jade variety.

Grayling, lenok, taimen, pike, burbot, crucian carp and peled are among the fish species found in the waters of the Amalat. The river is a destination for rafting and kayaking.

Course
The Amalat is a left tributary of the Tsipa. It has its sources in the southwestern slopes of the Vitim Plateau. It is known as Bolshoi Amalat (Big Amalat) in its upper course, before the confluence with its Maly Amalat (Little Amalat) tributary. The river flows roughly northeastwards and enters a floodplain in its middle reaches where its channel widens and begins meandering strongly, flowing almost parallel to the Vitim further south. Then it bends roughly northwards and finally meets the lower course of the Tsipa  from its mouth in the Vitim. About 90% of the Amalat basin area is covered by forests, mainly larch and mountain taiga.

The main tributaries of the Amalat are the Antase, Zhilinda, Ashigli and Ukshum from the right, and the Khoygot, Little Amalat and Sali from the left. The river is frozen between October and May.

See also
List of rivers of Russia

References

External links
3 ночи при -37 на р. Большой Амалат
Bolshoy Amalat River / Reports / Fishing only

Rivers of Buryatia